Eysseric is a French surname. Notable people with the surname include:

Jonathan Eysseric (born 1990), French tennis player
Valentin Eysseric (born 1992), French footballer

French-language surnames